Evil Emperor may refer to:

Evil Emperor Zurg, a character in the Toy Story franchise
Palpatine, or Darth Sidious, a character in Star Wars
Ming the Merciless, a character in the Flash Gordon comic strip and its related movie serials, television series and film adaptation

See also
Dark Lord, a powerful villain or antagonist with evil henchmen
Evil empire (disambiguation)